Anthony Scott (born 28 February 1995) is an Australian rules footballer who plays for the  in the Australian Football League (AFL). He was recruited by  through the 2021 Pre-season supplemental selection period.

Early football
Scott played for Old Trinity in the Victorian Amateur Football Association, after being undrafted in his draft year in 2013. He won the league's rising star award after a stellar 2014 season. He went to Footscray in the VFL in 2019, and was named vice-captain in 2020, although the season was cancelled due to the impact of the COVID-19 pandemic.

AFL career
On debut, Scott picked up 16 disposals, 5 inside 50s and 1 mark. It was revealed Scott had signed a two-year contract extension with the Bulldogs, tying him to the club until the end of the 2023 season.

Statistics
 Statistics are correct to the end of round 3, 2021.

|- style="background-color: #EAEAEA"
! scope="row" style="text-align:center" | 2021
|
| 28 || 3 || 1 || 1 || 21 || 19 || 40 || 7 || 4 || 0.3 || 0.3 || 7.0 || 6.3 || 13.3 || 2.3 || 1.3
|- class="sortbottom"
! colspan=3| Career
! 3
! 1
! 1
! 21
! 19
! 40
! 7
! 4
! 0.3
! 0.3
! 7.0
! 6.3
! 13.3
! 2.3
! 1.3
|}

References

External links

1995 births
Living people
Western Bulldogs players
Australian rules footballers from Victoria (Australia)